Rhett Thomas Rakhshani (born March 6, 1988) is an American former professional ice hockey player. He was selected by the New York Islanders in the fourth round (100th overall) of the 2006 NHL Entry Draft. Rakhshani is of Iranian–German–Mexican–American descent. He announced his retirement on December 14, 2022, after his wife had been diagnosed with cancer.

Playing career
As a youth, Rakhshani played in the 2002 Quebec International Pee-Wee Hockey Tournament with the California Wave minor ice hockey team.

Rakhshani played collegiately at the University of Denver between 2006 and 2010, and received All-America West First Team honors as a senior, before signing with the New York Islanders of the National Hockey League (NHL). He made his professional debut with the Islanders' affiliate, the Bridgeport Sound Tigers of the American Hockey League (AHL), in April 2010. He attended the 2010-11 AHL All-Star Classic and was named to the AHL All-Rookie Team the same season.

On December 13, 2010, Rakhshani suited up with the New York Islanders to make his NHL debut in an away game shutout loss against the Nashville Predators.

In 2012–13, he spent his first season abroad with HV71 of the Swedish Hockey League (SHL). After completing his first year in Sweden, he joined fellow SHL side Växjö Lakers, where he played from 2013 to 2015, helping win the 2014 Swedish championship. After spending the 2015-16 campaign with his third SHL team, Linköping HC, he signed to continue his SHL career with the Malmö Redhawks in June 2016. In 2018 Rakshani signed a three-year contract with the Gothenburg-based SHL team Frölunda Indians.

After 10 seasons in the SHL, Rakhshani left Sweden as a free agent and was signed to a one-year contract by the German club Grizzlys Wolfsburg of the Deutsche Eishockey Liga (DEL), on May 26, 2022. However, on December 14, he announced his retirement after his wife was diagnosed with cancer.

Career statistics

Regular season and playoffs

International

Awards and honors

References

External links

 

1988 births
Living people
AHCA Division I men's ice hockey All-Americans
American men's ice hockey forwards
American people of German descent
American people of Iranian descent
American people of Mexican descent
Bridgeport Sound Tigers players
Denver Pioneers men's ice hockey players
Djurgårdens IF Hockey players
Frölunda HC players
Grizzlys Wolfsburg players
HV71 players
Ice hockey players from California
Linköping HC players
Malmö Redhawks players
New York Islanders draft picks
New York Islanders players
Sportspeople from Orange, California
Sportspeople of Iranian descent
Växjö Lakers players